MV Neptuna was a 5,952 ton cargo motor vessel. She was launched as MV Rio Panuco in 1924, renamed MV Neptun in 1931 and finally became MV Neptuna in 1935. She was sunk during the Japanese air raid on Darwin on 19 February 1942, during World War II.

Career
Rio Panuco was built and launched in 1924 in Kiel by Friedrich Krupp Germaniawerft, Kiel for H. Schuldt's Flensburger Dampfer Co. She traded between Germany and Central America until 1931 when the company went bankrupt in the Great Depression.

She was sold to Norddeutscher Lloyd Line (NDL) of Bremen, who renamed her Neptun. By 1934 was running her on the service between New Guinea and Hong Kong in competition with Burns, Philp & Co. Burns, Philp asked the Australian Government to stop NDL from operating out of New Guinea but the government declined.

Instead the Australian government offered to pay the interest on any money Burns, Philp borrowed to buy her. This was agreed so in 1935 Burns, Philp bought her and renamed her Neptuna. Burns, Philp is an Australian company but it registered Neptuna in Hong Kong. She operated on the Australia, New Guinea, Philippines, Hong Kong, Saigon service. Saigon in French Indochina (now Ho Chi Minh City in Vietnam) was then the main source of supply of rice to New Guinea.

Sinking

In February 1942 Neptuna was off Stokes Hill Wharf, Darwin, Australia unloading a cargo of depth charges, TNT, and other armaments. MV Neptuna was sunk on 19 February 1942 during the 9:58 bombing raid in which bombs exploded in Neptuna's saloon and engine room. Forty-five men died on board including 9 wharf labourers and 36 crew members. Many others were seriously injured and the ship was set on fire. As the crew prepared to abandon her, 100 depth charges exploded, showering the harbour with debris and sending flames and smoke 100 metres into the air.

Part of the wreck was salvaged by the Fujita salvage operation in 1960.

References

Boniface, George W. "The Bombing of the MV Neptuna by Japanese in Darwin 1942" in Smith, Alan Carnegie. Outback Corridor. Plympton, S. Aust. : A.C. Smith, 2002. p. 205-213

Buckley, K. and Klugman, K. The Australian presence in the Pacific : Burns Philp, 1914–1946. Sydney : George Allen & Unwin, 1983.

McCarthy, Sophie. World War II shipwrecks and the first Japanese air raid on Darwin, 19 February 1942. Darwin : Northern Territory Museum of Arts & Sciences, 1992.

Smith, Neil C. With the red duster :  Gardenvale, Vic. : Mostly Unsung Military History Research and Publications, c 2006.

Steinberg, David Raising the war: Japanese salvage divers and allied shipwrecks in post-war Darwin Bulletin of the Australasian Institute for Maritime Archaeology, v.33, 2009: 11–18

External links
Australia's Merchant Navy
Photo of undamaged ship
The Ships List – Norddeutscher Lloyd
– Darwin, 19 February 1942 / by Brendan de Burca
 – Personal recollections of the bombing of Darwin – 1942 / written in 1987 by George W. Boniface.

World War II merchant ships of Australia
Ships sunk in the bombing of Darwin, 1942
Merchant ships sunk by aircraft
Maritime incidents in February 1942
Ships of Norddeutscher Lloyd
1924 ships